The Blennerhassett Baronetcy of Blennerville in the County of Kerry, is a title in the Baronetage of the United Kingdom. It was created on 22 September 1809 for Rowland Blennerhassett, the member of a family that was originally settled in Cumberland, England, and subsequently at Frenze, Norfolk, and Barsham, Suffolk. Members of the Blennerhassett family represented Carlisle in almost every Parliament from the reign of Richard II to the reign of James I. This branch of the family settled in County Kerry during the reign of James I and its members frequently represented County Kerry and Tralee in the Irish House of Commons. The first Baronet's son, the second Baronet, was High Sheriff of Kerry in 1823. He was succeeded by his son, the third Baronet. He served as High Sheriff of County Kerry in 1820. His son, the fourth Baronet, was a Liberal politician.

Rowland Blennerhassett, grandson of Rowland Blennerhassett, fourth son of the first Baronet, represented County Kerry in the House of Commons.

Blennerhassett baronets, of Blennerville (1809)
Sir Rowland Blennerhassett, 1st Baronet (1741–1821)
Sir Robert Blennerhassett, 2nd Baronet (1769–1831)
Sir Arthur Blennerhassett, 3rd Baronet (1794–1849)
Sir Rowland Blennerhassett, 4th Baronet (1839–1909)
Sir Arthur Charles Francis Bernard Blennerhassett, 5th Baronet (1871–1915)
Sir Marmaduke Charles Henry Joseph Blennerhassett, 6th Baronet (1902–1940)
Sir (Marmaduke) Adrian Francis William Blennerhassett, 7th Baronet (1940–2022)
Sir Charles Henry Marmaduke Blennerhassett, 8th Baronet (born 1975)

The heir apparent is the current baronet's only son Benjamin Casimir Marmaduke Blennerhassett (born 2015)

Notes

References
Kidd, Charles, Williamson, David (editors). Debrett's Peerage and Baronetage (1990 edition). New York: St Martin's Press, 1990, 

www.thepeerage.com

Baronetcies in the Baronetage of the United Kingdom
Lists of Irish people
baronet